Metamorphoses is a themed work of poetry composed by Ovid.

Metamorphoses may also refer to:

Cinema
 Métamorphoses (1946 film), directed by Charles Dekeukeleire
 Metamorphoses (1978 film), a 1978 anime film produced by Sanrio
 Métamorphoses (2014 film), directed by Christophe Honoré

Music
 Métamorphoses (album), a 2000 album by Jean-Michel Jarre
 Six Metamorphoses after Ovid, a piece for solo oboe by Benjamin Britten
 Metamorphosen, a work for 23 solo strings in 1945 by Richard Strauss

Literature
 The Golden Ass, by Lucius Apuleius
 Metamorphoses (play), by Mary Zimmerman based on Ovid's work
 Metamorphoses, by Antoninus Liberalis

Other uses
 Metamorphoses (TV series), a Brazilian telenovela television series starring Paolla Oliveira
 Ovid's Metamorphoses (sculpture), a 1889 sculpture by Auguste Rodin
 Metamorphoses, 1952 ballet choreographed by George Balanchine

See also
Métamorphose (disambiguation)
Metamorphosis (disambiguation)
 Metamorphism
 Metamorphosis
 The Metamorphosis, a 1915 allegorical novella written by Franz Kafka